In mathematics, a self-similar object is exactly or approximately similar to a part of itself (i.e., the whole has the same shape as one or more of the parts). Many objects in the real world, such as coastlines, are statistically self-similar: parts of them show the same statistical properties at many scales. Self-similarity is a typical property of fractals. Scale invariance is an exact form of self-similarity where at any magnification there is a smaller piece of the object that is similar to the whole. For instance, a side of the Koch snowflake is both symmetrical and scale-invariant; it can be continually magnified 3x without changing shape. The non-trivial similarity evident in fractals is distinguished by their fine structure, or detail on arbitrarily small scales. As a counterexample, whereas any portion of a straight line may resemble the whole, further detail is not revealed.

A time developing phenomenon is said to exhibit self-similarity if the numerical value of certain observable quantity 
 measured at different times are different but the corresponding dimensionless quantity at given value of  remain invariant. It happens if the quantity  exhibits dynamic scaling. The idea is just an extension of the idea of similarity of two triangles. Note that two triangles are similar if the numerical values of their sides are different however the corresponding dimensionless quantities, such as their angles, coincide.

Peitgen et al. explain the concept as such:

Since mathematically, a fractal may show self-similarity under indefinite magnification, it is impossible to recreate this physically. Peitgen et al. suggest studying self-similarity using approximations:

This vocabulary was introduced by Benoit Mandelbrot in 1964.

Self-affinity

In mathematics, self-affinity is a feature of a fractal whose pieces are scaled by different amounts in the x- and y-directions. This means that to appreciate the self similarity of these fractal objects, they have to be rescaled using an anisotropic affine transformation.

Definition
A compact topological space X is self-similar if there exists a finite set S indexing a set of non-surjective homeomorphisms  for which

We call

a self-similar structure. The homeomorphisms may be iterated, resulting in an iterated function system. The composition of functions creates the algebraic structure of a monoid. When the set S has only two elements, the monoid is known as the dyadic monoid. The dyadic monoid can be visualized as an infinite binary tree; more generally, if the set S has p elements, then the monoid may be represented as a p-adic tree.

The automorphisms of the dyadic monoid is the modular group; the automorphisms can be pictured as hyperbolic rotations of the binary tree.

A more general notion than self-similarity is Self-affinity.

Examples

The Mandelbrot set is also self-similar around Misiurewicz points.

Self-similarity has important consequences for the design of computer networks, as typical network traffic has self-similar properties. For example, in teletraffic engineering, packet switched data traffic patterns seem to be statistically self-similar.  This property means that simple models using a Poisson distribution are inaccurate, and networks designed without taking self-similarity into account are likely to function in unexpected ways.

Similarly, stock market movements are described as displaying self-affinity, i.e. they appear self-similar when transformed via an appropriate affine transformation for the level of detail being shown. Andrew Lo  describes stock market log return self-similarity in  econometrics.

Finite subdivision rules are a powerful technique for building self-similar sets, including the Cantor set and the Sierpinski triangle.

In cybernetics 
The viable system model of Stafford Beer is an organizational model with an affine self-similar hierarchy, where a given viable system is one element of the System One of a viable system one recursive level higher up, and for whom the elements of its System One are viable systems one recursive level lower down.

In nature 

Self-similarity can be found in nature, as well. To the right is a mathematically generated, perfectly self-similar image of a fern, which bears a marked resemblance to natural ferns. Other plants, such as Romanesco broccoli, exhibit strong self-similarity.

In music 
 Strict canons display various types and amounts of self-similarity, as do sections of fugues.
 A Shepard tone is self-similar in the frequency or wavelength domains.
 The Danish composer Per Nørgård has made use of a self-similar integer sequence named the 'infinity series' in much of his music.
 In the research field of music information retrieval, self-similarity commonly refers to the fact that music often consists of parts that are repeated in time. In other words, music is self-similar under temporal translation, rather than (or in addition to) under scaling.

See also

References

External links
 "Copperplate Chevrons" — a self-similar fractal zoom movie
 "Self-Similarity" — New articles about Self-Similarity. Waltz Algorithm

Self-affinity

Fractals
Scaling symmetries
Homeomorphisms
Self-reference